The Wiley Bad Science Series  is a series of books by John Wiley & Sons Publishing about scientific misconceptions.

The Publishers Weekly review of the first book in the series, Bad Astronomy, mentioned that the subsequent books will be about scientific misconceptions in  biology, weather and the earth.
 2002: Bad Astronomy: Misconceptions and Misuses Revealed, from Astrology to the Moon Landing "Hoax", by Philip C. Plait
 2003: Bad Medicine: Misconceptions and Misuses Revealed, from Distance Healing to Vitamin O, by Christopher Wanjek

References

Wiley (publisher) books
Misconceptions
American non-fiction books